Peace Officers Memorial Day and Police Week is an observance in the United States that pays tribute to the local, state, and federal peace officers who have died, or who have been disabled, in the line of duty.  It is celebrated May 15th of each year. The event is sponsored by the National Fraternal Order of Police (FOP) and is implemented by the  FOP Memorial Committee.

National Police Week 
The formal memorial is on May 15, and Police Week is the calendar week in which the memorial falls. Other events of National Police Week include an annual Blue Mass, Candlelight Vigil, Wreath Laying Ceremony, National Police Survivors Conference, Honor Guard Competition, and the Emerald Society & Pipe Band March and Service. The annual event draws 25,000 to 40,000 law enforcement officers, their families, and other visitors to attend.

Enactment
The holiday was created on October 1, 1961, when Congress authorized the president to designate May 15 to honor peace officers.  John F. Kennedy signed the bill into law on October 1, 1962. The proclamation signed by President  Kennedy read:

87th Congress of the United States of America

Joint Resolution         76 Stat. 676.

Subsequent proclamations

Amended in 1994, Bill Clinton, through Public Law 103-322, directed that the flag of the United States be flown at half-staff on May 15. According to a proclamation by George W. Bush in 2002,

At the National Peace Officer's Memorial Service on May 15, 2013, President Barack Obama paid tribute to fallen law enforcement officers, closing:

Much of the holiday centers on the National Law Enforcement Officers Memorial wall in Washington, D.C., whose walls feature the names of more than 21,183 law enforcement officers who have been killed in the line of duty.

References

External links
Joint Resolution of Congress (76 Stat. 676)

Public holidays in the United States
May observances
Remembrance days
1961 establishments in the United States
Recurring events established in 1961
Police days